A mousepad is a surface for placing and moving a computer mouse. A mousepad enhances the usability of the mouse compared to using a mouse directly on a table by providing a surface to allow it to measure movement accurately and without jitter. Some mousepads increase ergonomics by providing a padded wrist rest, although the benefits of this are debatable.

History

During a 1968 presentation by Douglas Engelbart marking the public debut of a mouse, 
Engelbart used a control console designed by Jack Kelley of Herman Miller that included a keyboard and an inset portion used as a support area for the mouse.
According to Kelley 
and also stated by Alex Pang, Kelley designed the first mousepad a year later, in 1969.

Details of a mousepad designed by Armando M. Fernandez were published in the Xerox Disclosure Journal in 1979 with the description:

By 1982, most users of the Xerox ball mouse were using special pads to increase the friction of the ball in the mouse.

The first commercial manufacturer of mousepads was Moustrak, founded by Bob McDermand. The company began gaining traction when Apple decided to distribute its mousepads, featuring the Apple logo, to computer stores in the United States. Moustrak signed licensing deals with Disney, Paramount, and LucasFilm, and advertised in magazines including MacWorld. However, by the end of the 1980s, lower cost mousepads turned the product into a commodity.

The Oxford English Dictionary tracks the term mouse pad to the August 24, 1983, publication of InfoWorld, and the predominantly British term mousemat to October 17, 1989, in the publication 3D.

Benefits

The three most important benefits of the introduction of the mousepad were higher speed, more precision, and comfort for the user.  A secondary benefit was keeping the desk or table surface from being scratched and worn by continuous hand and mouse rubbing motion.  Another benefit was reduction of the collection of debris under the mouse, which resulted in reduced jitter of the pointer on the display. Also, it is important to clean mousepads.

The mousepads can be cleaned by special detergents, liquid soap, hand wash or dry cleaning. Not all mousepads are machine washable.

When optical mice, which use image sensors to detect movement, were first introduced into the market, they required special mousepads with optical patterns printed on them. Modern optical mice can function to an acceptable degree of accuracy on plain paper and other surfaces.  However, some optical mouse users (especially gamers, designers, and other heavy users) may prefer a mousepad for comfort, speed and accuracy, and to prevent wear to the desk or table surface.

Types

A variety of mousepads exist with many different textured surfaces to fit various types of mouse technologies. Vinyl board cover, because of its natural adhesive properties, was a popular mousepad surface around 1980. 

After the steel mouse ball was given a silicone rubber surface, the popular fabric-surface mousepad was found to be the most appropriate. It helped keep the rubberized roller-ball surface cleaner and gave better tracking, speed and accuracy than just a desk surface. Such surfaces collected dirt which was then deposited onto the internal rollers that picked off ball movement. Dirty rollers caused erratic pointer movement on the screen.

Early types of optical mice have the problem of not working well on transparent or reflective surfaces such as glass or highly polished wood. These surfaces, which often include desk and table surfaces, cause jitter and loss of tracking on the display pointer as the mouse moves over these reflective spots. The use of mousepads with precision surfaces eliminates spot jitter effects of older and/or low-quality optical mice.

Newer generations of mouse pads incorporate a wireless charging system into the pad, allowing a wireless mouse to be used without the need to replace or recharge batteries. (ex. Logitech PowerPlay)

Materials
Modern mousepads are typically made of lesser density rubber composites (open cell styrene, butadiene rubber or open cell SBR) with fabric bonded to the upper surface. However, many other types of material have been used, including fabric, plastics, recycled rubber tires, neoprene, silicone rubber, leather, glass, cork, wood, aluminum, stone and stainless steel.

References

External links 

pad

Computer mice
History of human–computer interaction
American inventions
Computer-related introductions in 1969